Laarni Lozada is the eponymous debut album from Pinoy Dream Academy Season 2 winner Laarni Lozada, released on November 27, 2008. The lead single was "Kung Iniibig Ka Niya".

Track listing
 "Kung Iniibig Ka Niya"
 "You're Someone I Belong To"
 "Sa ‘Yo Lamang"
 "Alipin Ako"
 "Bakit Nga Ba Mahal Kita"
 "Manalig Ka"

Covers
 Liezel Garcia's Alipin Ako cover was used as the theme song for the Korean drama You're Still The One which aired in ABS-CBN.

References

2008 debut albums
Laarni Lozada albums